Emmett Shear (born 1983) is an American internet entrepreneur and investor. He is the co-founder of live video platforms Justin.tv and Twitch. He was the chief executive officer of Twitch until March 2023 and is also a part-time partner at venture capital firm Y Combinator.

Early life and education
Emmett Shear earned a Bachelor of Science degree in Computer Science from Yale University in 2005.

Career

Justin.tv 
In 2006, Shear, along with partners Justin Kan, Michael Seibel and Kyle Vogt, started Justin.tv, a 24/7 live video feed of Kan's life, broadcast via a webcam attached to his head.

Kan's "lifecasting" lasted about eight months but the four partners decided to transition to providing a live video platform so anyone could publish a live video stream. Launched in 2007, Justin.tv was one of the largest live video platforms in the world with more than 30 million unique users every month until it was shut down on August 5, 2014.

On August 29, 2011, Shear became CEO.

Twitch 
After Justin.tv launched in 2007, the site quickly began building subject-specific content categories like Social, Tech, Sports, Entertainment, News & Events, Gaming, and others. Gaming, in particular, grew very fast and became the most popular content on the site.

In June 2011, the company decided to spin off the gaming content under a separate brand and site. They named it TwitchTV, inspired by the term twitch gameplay. It launched officially in public beta on June 6, 2011.

On August 25, 2014, Amazon officially acquired Twitch for a reported $970,000,000.

In March 2020, during the COVID-19 pandemic, via Twitch, Shear announced that he is donating US$1 million to the women and minority-owned Three Babes Bakeshop in San Francisco's Bayview neighborhood. The money will be used to form a nonprofit organization to keep small businesses working as people are supposed to stay home during the outbreak.

In March 2023, Shear announced that he was resigning as CEO and Daniel J. Clancy will take over.

Y Combinator 
Shear became a part-time partner at Y Combinator in June 2011, where he offers advice to the new startups in each batch. He was a member of the first batch of YC-funded startups in 2005 for Kiko Calendar, and was funded by YC again for Justin.tv.

Notes

References

External links 

1983 births
Businesspeople in information technology
Living people
Y Combinator people
Twitch (service) people
Amazon (company) people
20th-century American Jews
21st-century American businesspeople
21st-century American Jews